Guy Modeste (10 August 1954 – 19 December 2018) was a French professional footballer.

Early and personal life
Born in Saint-Pierre, Martinique, Modeste's brothers are also footballers - Sully, Floriva and Roger. His son Anthony is also a footballer.

Career
A libero, he joined Saint-Étienne in 1972. He played for the B team in the 1976–77 season, and spent time on loan at Cannes. He made his senior debut for Saint-Étienne in the 1978–79 season, and later played for Cannes, Châteauroux and Fréjus.

Later life and death
He died in Paris from cancer at the age of 64.

References

1954 births
2018 deaths
French footballers
AS Saint-Étienne players
AS Cannes players
LB Châteauroux players
ÉFC Fréjus Saint-Raphaël players
Ligue 2 players
Ligue 1 players
Association football defenders